Edwin "Ted" Davis (born 1892 in Bedminster, Bristol) was a professional footballer, who played for Clapton Orient, Huddersfield Town & Blackburn Rovers. He is Bath City’s longest serving and most successful manager of all time.

Management career

Davis was appointed at Bath City in 1927.  In 1929, Davis won the club their first competitive trophy, The Somerset Cup. The following season, the team finished first in the Southern League Western Section - the clubs highest-ever league placing. Though Bath lost 3–2 in the play offs to Eastern Section Champions Aldershot Town, hence, they were less applicable for election to the Third Division. The season was labelled "the best in the club's history by the Bath Chronicle."  In 1933, the club won the Southern League Western Section for a second time, but lost in the final to play–off Eastern Section Champions Norwich City 2–1. In 1937, Davis left Bath for Colchester United. 

Ted Davis rejoined Bath City in 1939, Upon the Outbreak of the Second World War, Bath were, by chance, accepted to join the temporary Football League North, competing with the likes of Liverpool, Manchester United, Aston Villa and Everton, finishing the eventual champions under Davis, thereby becoming the only semi-professional side ever to win a Football League trophy. In 1944, the club were, once again, in talks for entry into the English Football League, with the aim of being admitted into either the Third Division, or the planned Fourth Division, which had not yet been established.

However, on 27 July 1945, the Football League's management committee refused to allow any non-league clubs into the Third Division, despite Third League clubs "wanting Bath City to join". Thus, after the War, with the resumption of competitive football, they were forced to resume playing in the Southern League.  Ted Davis, then left the club in 1947. In total, Davis spent 17 years as first team coach. He went on to become the most successful and longest serving manager in the club's history, winning seven trophies.

References

1892 births
Year of death missing
English footballers
Footballers from Bristol
Association football goalkeepers
English Football League players
Leyton Orient F.C. players
Huddersfield Town A.F.C. players
Blackburn Rovers F.C. players
Bath City F.C. managers
English football managers